Tree anemone may refer to several different taxa:

 Acrozoanthus australiae, a species of coral
 Actinodendron arboreum, a species of sea anemone
 Carpenteria californica, a species of evergreen shrub